Lucian Romașcanu (born 19 May 1967, Focșani, Vrancea County, Romania) is a Romanian politician, elected senator in 2016 in Buzău County on the lists of the Social Democratic Party (PSD). In 2017, he served as Minister of Culture in the government of Mihai Tudose. Since January 2017, he has been the Chairman of the Committee on Culture and Media of the Romanian Senate.

Starting on 25 November he became the Minister of Culture again in the government of Nicolae Ciucă.

References 

Social Democratic Party (Romania) politicians

Romanian Ministers of Culture
1967 births

Living people